Tell Tale Signs may refer to:

The Bootleg Series Vol. 8: Tell Tale Signs: Rare and Unreleased 1989–2006, Bob Dylan
"Tell Tale Signs", song by Bananarama from the album Deep Sea Skiving
"Tell Tale Signs", song by China Crisis from the album Autumn in the Neighbourhood
"Tell Tale Signs", song by Kylie Minogue from the album  Enjoy Yourself
"Tell Tale Signs", song by Jerry Lee Lewis from the album  I-40 Country 
"Tell Tale Signs", song by Frank Turner from the album  Tape Deck Heart